Benjamin Russell Brown (born 26 May 1960) is a British journalist and news presenter for BBC News. Ben Brown is currently a presenter on BBC News at One (1:00pm), BBC Weekend News, BBC News Channel and BBC World News.

Early life
Benjamin Russell Brown was born on 26 May 1960 in Kent. He is the son of the ITN newscaster Antony Brown. Brown was educated at Sutton Valence School, an independent school near Maidstone. During his time at school, Brown was on the debating team, and took second place in the national debating championships. He won an Open Scholarship to Keble College, Oxford, where he studied Philosophy, politics and economics, before graduating from the Cardiff School of Journalism, Media and Cultural Studies with a diploma with distinction. He joined Radio Clyde in Glasgow as a reporter, and later became a reporter for Radio City in Liverpool.

Career

Reporting
In 1986, Brown joined Independent Radio News, covering major stories from superpower summits to the Hungerford massacre. He joined BBC TV News two years later and was a Foreign Affairs Correspondent until 1991, reporting the fall of the Berlin Wall and the Gulf War, from Saudi Arabia and Kuwait.

He was appointed Moscow Correspondent in 1991, where he witnessed the final collapse of Communism and the fall of Mikhail Gorbachev. He was at the Russian Parliament when troops loyal to President Boris Yeltsin stormed it in 1993, and the following year he was in Chechnya for the start of the civil war. His coverage of that conflict won him several international prizes, including the Bayeux War Correspondent of the Year Award and the Golden Nymph Award from the Monte-Carlo Television Festival.

In January 1995, Brown resumed his roving role as a foreign correspondent, based in London. He covered the break-up of Yugoslavia extensively, reporting from Bosnia-Herzegovina, Croatia and Kosovo, where his stories helped to secure several awards for the BBC, including a BAFTA (British Academy of Film and Television Arts) award.

In 2001 he won the Bayeux-Calvados Award for war correspondents for the second time for his coverage of the Intifada in Israel.
 
More recently, in 2003 Brown was embedded with British troops in the Iraq War. He wrote about his experiences in a book, The Battle for Iraq, notably how a British soldier saved his life by opening fire on an Iraqi militiaman who was just about to shoot Ben in the back with a rocket-propelled grenade. Brown covered the first Gulf War in 1991, and his account of that, All Necessary Means was also published.

In December 2010, Brown was criticised by viewers for adopting a "highly accusatory" tone during an interview he conducted on BBC News with Jody McIntyre, a political activist with cerebral palsy who had been dragged from his wheelchair by Metropolitan Police officers during a student protest march through London.

Brown is currently a relief presenter on the BBC News Channel.

In May 2017, he was interrupted by a passer-by while conducting a live interview on the street in Bradford. The female passer-by walked into shot, looked into the camera and said "Absolutely fantastic". After looking at the woman, Brown did not ask her to leave, but reached out his arm to move her out of the shot and "pushed the woman away, his hand on her chest". The BBC said that no further action would be taken as it was "clearly an accident".

On February 2 2023, it was confirmed that Brown – alongside many other presenters of the domestic BBC News Channel – would lose their presenting roles as part of the BBC's relaunched news channel.

Other work
Brown wrote a novel based on his experiences of war reporting, entitled Sandstealers. The novel was published in May 2009 by HarperCollins.

Personal life
Brown is married with three children.

References

Bibliography
 Brown, Ben (1991) All Necessary Means: Gulf War and Its Aftermath BBC Books 
 Beck, S & Downing, M (ed.)(2003) The Battle for Iraq: BBC News Correspondents on the War against Saddam and a New World Agenda  BBC Books

External links
 
 "'Then she pulled me closer and started to sob uncontrollably on my shoulder' on a defining moment in the tsunami coverage" Ben Brown, The Observer, 16 January 2005
 "War reporters hit back at tie jibes" Zoe Smith, Press Gazette, 3 August 2006
  Hannah Ellis-Petersen, The Guardian, 16 May 2017

1960 births
BBC newsreaders and journalists
BBC World News
Alumni of Keble College, Oxford
People from Ashford, Kent
Living people
People educated at Sutton Valence School